Enoclerus is a genus of checkered beetles in the subfamily Clerinae.

Species 
These species belong to the genus Enoclerus:

 Enoclerus abdominalis (Chevrolat, 1835)
 Enoclerus ablusus Barr, 1978
 Enoclerus acerbus Wolcott, 1911
 Enoclerus addisoni Rifkind, 2004
 Enoclerus aethiops Barr, 1978
 Enoclerus albidulus Rifkind, 2012
 Enoclerus albosignatus Ekis, 1976
 Enoclerus alvarengai Ekis, 1976
 Enoclerus analis (LeConte, 1849)
 Enoclerus anceps (Gorham, 1882)
 Enoclerus anctus Rifkind, 2012
 Enoclerus angustus (LeConte, 1849)
 Enoclerus apicatus (Schenkling, 1906)
 Enoclerus arachnodes (Klug, 1842)
 Enoclerus arrowi (Schenkling, 1907)
 Enoclerus artifex (Spinola, 1844)
 Enoclerus aspera Opitz, 2021
 Enoclerus auripilus Ekis, 1976
 Enoclerus axilaris (Erichson, 1847)
 Enoclerus badeni (Gorham, 1876)
 Enoclerus bahia Opitz, 2021
 Enoclerus barri Knull, 1965
 Enoclerus beatus (Gorham, 1882)
 Enoclerus bellamyi Rifkind, 1996
 Enoclerus bellus (Schenkling, 1898)
 Enoclerus bicarinatus (Gorham, 1882)
 Enoclerus bilobus (Spinola, 1844)
 Enoclerus bimaculatus (Skinner, 1905)
 Enoclerus binodulus (Gorham, 1876)
 Enoclerus bispinis Wolcott, 1927
 Enoclerus boblloydi Rifkind, 2012
 Enoclerus bolivar Opitz, 2021
 Enoclerus bombycinus (Chevrolat, 1833)
 Enoclerus boquete Rifkind, 2012
 Enoclerus brevicollis (Spinola, 1844)
 Enoclerus campbelli Opitz, 2021
 Enoclerus canus Ekis, 1976
 Enoclerus capillus Opitz, 2021
 Enoclerus caraca Opitz, 2021
 Enoclerus cautus (Gorham, 1883)
 Enoclerus cauca Opitz, 2021
 Enoclerus cavei Rifkind, 2012
 Enoclerus ceara Opitz, 2021
 Enoclerus cedro Opitz, 2021
 Enoclerus chagra Opitz, 2021
 Enoclerus chamelae Rifkind, 2012
 Enoclerus cinctus Opitz, 2021
 Enoclerus cinereopilosus (Blanchard, 1843)
 Enoclerus citricornis Rifkind, 2012
 Enoclerus citrinifrons Rifkind, 2017
 Enoclerus coccineus (Schenkling, 1906)
 Enoclerus colorados Opitz, 2021
 Enoclerus comptus (Klug, 1842)
 Enoclerus concinnus (Gorham, 1883)
 Enoclerus condinamarca Opitz, 2021
 Enoclerus contractus (Gorham, 1882)
 Enoclerus corcovado Opitz, 2021
 Enoclerus cordifer (LeConte, 1849)
 Enoclerus cosnipata Opitz, 2021
 Enoclerus crabronarius (Spinola, 1844)
 Enoclerus crinitus Rifkind, 2012
 Enoclerus cupressi Van Dyke, 1915
 Enoclerus cura Opitz, 2021
 Enoclerus cusco Opitz, 2021
 Enoclerus decussatus (Klug, 1842)
 Enoclerus deletus Wolcott, 1927
 Enoclerus deliciolus (Gorham, 1876)
 Enoclerus delusus Rifkind, 2017
 Enoclerus dichrous Chapin, 1927
 Enoclerus distinctus (Spinola, 1844)
 Enoclerus erro Wolcott, 1922
 Enoclerus erwini Ekis, 1976
 Enoclerus eximius (Mannerheim, 1843)
 Enoclerus faber (Chevrolat, 1874)
 Enoclerus farragoinis Opitz, 2021
 Enoclerus fascia Opitz, 2021
 Enoclerus fasciatus (Schenkling, 1900)
 Enoclerus fasciicollis (Schenkling, 1900)
 Enoclerus fauna Opitz, 2021
 Enoclerus faustus (Schenkling, 1900)
 Enoclerus festivus (Gorham, 1876)
 Enoclerus fibrillatus Rifkind, 2012
 Enoclerus flavibasis Chapin, 1927
 Enoclerus fractus Opitz, 2021
 Enoclerus franki Barr & Rifkind, 2007
 Enoclerus fugitivus Wolcott, 1927
 Enoclerus gabriellae Rifkind, 1994
 Enoclerus gerhardi Wolcott, 1922
 Enoclerus gibboclerus Opitz, 2021
 Enoclerus gibbus Ekis, 1976
 Enoclerus gilli Rifkind, 2012
 Enoclerus gorgona Opitz, 2021
 Enoclerus grenade Opitz, 2021
 Enoclerus guiana Opitz, 2021
 Enoclerus gumae Rifkind, 1995
 Enoclerus hefferni Rifkind, 2021
 Enoclerus hespenheidei Rifkind, 2012
 Enoclerus hieroglyphicus (Gorham, 1876)
 Enoclerus hoegei (Gorham, 1883)
 Enoclerus hogei (Gorham, 1882)
 Enoclerus hovorei Barr & Rifkind, 2007
 Enoclerus huallaga Opitz, 2021
 Enoclerus huila Opitz, 2021
 Enoclerus ichneumoneus (Fabricius, 1777)
 Enoclerus incanus Rifkind, 2017
 Enoclerus inimicoides Chapin, 1927
 Enoclerus inyoensis Van Dyke, 1938
 Enoclerus irregularis Barr, 1978
 Enoclerus itajura Opitz, 2021
 Enoclerus junin Opitz, 2021
 Enoclerus juquilensis Rifkind, 2016
 Enoclerus kaw Opitz, 2021
 Enoclerus knabi (Wolcott, 1910)
 Enoclerus laetus (Klug, 1842)
 Enoclerus laportei (Spinola, 1844)
 Enoclerus larioja Opitz, 2021
 Enoclerus lautus Wolcott, 1922
 Enoclerus lecontei (Wolcott, 1910) (blackbellied clerid)
 Enoclerus leehermani Ekis, 1976
 Enoclerus liljebladi Wolcott, 1922
 Enoclerus longissimus Wolcott, 1922
 Enoclerus loreto Opitz, 2021
 Enoclerus losvolvanes Opitz, 2021
 Enoclerus lugubris (Erichson, 1847)
 Enoclerus lunatus (Klug, 1842)
 Enoclerus luridus Opitz, 2021
 Enoclerus luscus (Klug, 1842)
 Enoclerus maldonado Opitz, 2021
 Enoclerus mata Opitz, 2021
 Enoclerus matamata Opitz, 2021
 Enoclerus meta Opitz, 2021
 Enoclerus mcnallyi Rifkind, 2012
 Enoclerus melissae Rifkind, 2012
 Enoclerus meridanus (Chevrolat, 1874)
 Enoclerus mexicanus (Castelnau, 1836)
 Enoclerus militaris (Schenkling, 1906)
 Enoclerus minas Opitz, 2020
 Enoclerus miniatus (Spinola, 1844)
 Enoclerus mocho Rifkind, 2012
 Enoclerus moestus (Klug, 1842)
 Enoclerus monteverde Opitz, 2021
 Enoclerus morrisi Opitz, 2021
 Enoclerus mutabilis (Chevrolat, 1874)
 Enoclerus muttkowskii (Wolcott, 1909)
 Enoclerus napo Opitz, 2021
 Enoclerus nelsoni Barr, 1978
 Enoclerus nigricans Barr, 1978
 Enoclerus nigrifrons (Say, 1823)
 Enoclerus nigripes (Say, 1823)
 Enoclerus nigromaculatus (Chevrolat, 1843)
 Enoclerus nodulifer Gorham, 1927
 Enoclerus nova Opitz, 2021
 Enoclerus obrieni Ekis, 1976
 Enoclerus ocreatus (Horn, 1885)
 Enoclerus octavus Opitz, 2021
 Enoclerus opifex (Gorham, 1882)
 Enoclerus opitzi Rifkind, 2012
 Enoclerus ordinis Opitz, 2021
 Enoclerus pacificus Rifkind, 2002
 Enoclerus palmii (Schaeffer, 1904)
 Enoclerus para Opitz, 2021
 Enoclerus paula Opitz, 2021
 Enoclerus pedraazul Opitz, 2021
 Enoclerus peruvianus Pic, 1936
 Enoclerus philogenes Rifkind, 2017
 Enoclerus pictilis Opitz, 2021
 Enoclerus pictus Opitz, 2021
 Enoclerus pilatei (Chevrolat, 1874)
 Enoclerus pinus (Schaeffer, 1905)
 Enoclerus pisinnus Barr, 1978
 Enoclerus planonotatus (Castelnau, 1836)
 Enoclerus puellus Gorham, 1886
 Enoclerus puravida Rifkind, 1997
 Enoclerus pusio (Schenkling, 1906)
 Enoclerus quadriguttatus (Olivier, 1795)
 Enoclerus quadrinodosus (Chevrolat, 1874)
 Enoclerus quadrisignatus (Say, 1835)
 Enoclerus quercus (Schaeffer, 1905)
 Enoclerus reburrus Barr, 1978
 Enoclerus reductesignatus Rifkind, 2017
 Enoclerus regius Rifkind, 2002
 Enoclerus regnadkcin Rifkind, 2012
 Enoclerus rio Opitz, 2021
 Enoclerus riocuare Opitz, 2021
 Enoclerus rionegro Opitz, 2021
 Enoclerus rondonia Opitz, 2021
 Enoclerus rosmarus (Say, 1823)
 Enoclerus rubidus Opitz, 2021
 Enoclerus rubra Opitz, 2021
 Enoclerus ruficollis (Laporte de Castelnau, 1836)
 Enoclerus rufimanus (Schenkling, 1900)
 Enoclerus rufofemoratus (Schenkling, 1915)
 Enoclerus sagittarius Ekis, 1976
 Enoclerus salta Opitz, 2020
 Enoclerus salvini (Gorham, 1876)
 Enoclerus schaefferi Barr, 1947
 Enoclerus sericeus Ekis, 1976
 Enoclerus signifer Barr, 1978
 Enoclerus sinop Opitz, 2021
 Enoclerus skillmani Rifkind, 2012
 Enoclerus sphegeus (Fabricius, 1787) (red-bellied clerid)
 Enoclerus spinolae (LeConte 1853) (handsome yucca beetle)
 Enoclerus teutonia Opitz, 2021
 Enoclerus thomasi Opitz, 2020
 Enoclerus tigris Rifkind, 2002
 Enoclerus toledoi Rifkind, 2012
 Enoclerus torquatus (Chevrolat, 1874)
 Enoclerus tricinctus (Chevrolat, 1874)
 Enoclerus triplagiatus (Blanchard, 1843)
 Enoclerus tubercularis (Gorham, 1882)
 Enoclerus tucuman Opitz, 2021
 Enoclerus urbanus Rifkind, 2012
 Enoclerus valens Barr & Rifkind, 2009
 Enoclerus velha Opitz, 2021
 Enoclerus venator (Chevrolat, 1843)
 Enoclerus vera Opitz, 2021
 Enoclerus vernalis Barr & Rifkind, 2009
 Enoclerus versicolor (Laporte, 1836)
 Enoclerus vetus (Wolcott, 1927)
 Enoclerus viduus (Klug, 1842)
 Enoclerus villicus (Gorham, 1886)
 Enoclerus virginiensis (Schaeffer, 1917)
 Enoclerus vista Opitz, 2021
 Enoclerus vulnus Ekis, 1976
 Enoclerus wappesi Opitz, 2021
 Enoclerus whiteheadi Ekis, 1976
 Enoclerus x-album (Gorham, 1883)
 Enoclerus yasuni Opitz, 2021
 Enoclerus yungas Opitz, 2021
 Enoclerus zebra (Chevrolat, 1843)
 Enoclerus zebroides Barr, 1976
 Enoclerus zip Rifkind, 2017
 Enoclerus zonatus (Klug, 1842)

References 

 Ekis, G. 1976. Neotropical checkered beetles of the genus enoclerus (coleoptera: cleridae: Clerinae), Studies on Neotropical Fauna and Environment, 11:3, 151-172, doi:10.1080/01650527609360501
 Barr, W.F. 1978: New species of Enoclerus from Mexico, Central America, and Venezuela (Coleoptera: Cleridae). Coleopterists Bulletin, 32 (4): 269–278
Ekis, G. 1978: Comparative anatomy and systematic significance of the internal organs of checkered beetles. Part II. Reproductive systems of the New World genus Enoclerus Gahan (Coleoptera: Cleridae). Coleopterists Bulletin, 32 (4): 279–297
 Mawdsley, J.R. 2001: Cladistic analysis of Nearctic species of Enoclerus Gahan (Coleoptera: Cleridae), with discussion of the evolution of mimicry and cryptic coloration. Transactions of the American Entomological Society, 127(4): 459–471
Rifkind, J. 2004. "A New Species of Enoclerus Gahan (Coleoptera: Cleridae) from Colombia," The Coleopterists Bulletin 58(3), 393-395. doi:10.1649/635
Barr, W.F. & Rifkind, J. 2007: Two new species of neotropical Enoclerus Gahan (Coleoptera: Cleridae: Clerinae). Coleopterists Bulletin, 61 (2): 195–199
 Barr, W.F. & Rifkind, J. 2009: Two new and one resurrected species of Enoclerus Gahan (Coleoptera: Cleridae: Clerinae) from the western United States. Zootaxa, 2168: 57–62
 Rifkind, J. 2012: New Central American and Mexican Enoclerus Gahan (Coleoptera: Cleridae: Clerinae): Part II. Zootaxa 3397: 1–27 doi:10.11646/zootaxa.3397.1.1
 Rifkind, J. 2016. A New Species of Enoclerus Gahan (Coleoptera: Cleridae: Clerinae) from the Sierra Sur of Oaxaca, Mexico, The Coleopterists Bulletin 70(1), 168-170. doi:10.1649/072.070.0124
 Rifkind, J. 2017. New species of Mutillid Mimicking Enoclerus Gahan (Coleoptera: Cleridae: Clerinae) from Mexico and Central America. Zootaxa 4321(3): 409–420. doi:10.11646/zootaxa.4231.3.7
 Opitz W. 2020. Three new species of South American checkered beetles (Coleoptera: Cleridae: Clerinae). Insecta Mundi 0832: 1–5.
 Rifkind J. 2021. Enoclerus hefferni, a new species of checkered beetle (Coleoptera: Cleridae: Clerinae) from Honduras, with additions to the Honduran Enoclerus Gahan fauna. Insecta Mundi 0847: 1–4.
 Opitz, W. 2021. New South American checkered beetles of the genus Enoclerus (Coleoptera, Cleridae, Clerinae). Linzer Biologische Beiträge 53(1): 123-169

External links 

 
 

Cleridae genera
Clerinae